Modisi is a village in South Bolaang Mongondow Regency, North Sulawesi Province, Indonesia.

Geography 
Modisi is located at the southern tip of the island of Sulawesi. The land area is 248.6 hectares. Modisi is also a town that has a coastline of 3.7 kilometers. The town is also surrounded by hills and mountain ranges. The land area is dominated by hilly areas with some lowlands in the coastal area. The elevation interval of the plains is between 0-40% with the highest peak in the dinopian plume. Modisi has a tropical rainforest climate with heavy to very heavy rainfall year-round. The average rainfall is 2,367 mm/year with the driest climate around August and the wettest in January. The intensity of sunlight is on average 53% and relative humidity is ±84%.

Climate 

Modisi has a tropical rainforest climate (Af) with heavy to very heavy rainfall year-round. Modisi's climate is tropical. Modisi has a significant amount of rainfall during the year. This is true even for the driest month. This location is classified as Af by Köppen and Geiger. The average temperature in Modisi is 24.5 °C | 76.0 °F. Approx. 2367 mm | 93.2 inches of precipitation falls every year With an average of 24.9 °C | 76.9 °F, December is the warmest month. At 23.6 °C | Average 74.5 °F, July is coldest month of the year.

References

External links 
 

 Huge Waves Cause Flooding in Modisi, Sulawesi, Indonesia - 17 Jan. 2021

 

Populated places in North Sulawesi
Villages in Indonesia